Brachyotum ecuadorense is a species of plant in the family Melastomataceae. It is endemic to Ecuador.  Its natural habitat is subtropical or tropical high-altitude shrubland.

References

ecuadorense
Endemic flora of Ecuador
Endangered plants
Taxonomy articles created by Polbot